"Breathing" is a pop song written by Peter Bjørnskov and recorded by Danish singer Bryan Rice. The song was included on his third studio album, Another Piece of Me.

On 12 January 2010, "Breathing" was announced as one of the ten songs to compete in the Dansk Melodi Grand Prix to select the song to represent Denmark in the Eurovision Song Contest 2010.  On 6 February, the song made it to the super final, ultimately finishing second behind "In a Moment like This" by Chanée & N'evergreen.

Track listing 
Digital download
 "Breathing" – 3:02

Weekly charts

References 

2010 singles
2009 songs
Bryan Rice songs
Songs written by Peter Bjørnskov
Pop ballads